In the 1992–93 Quebec Nordiques season, the Nordiques qualified for the playoffs for the first time since the 1986–87 season. Joe Sakic became captain (after a stint as co-captain in 1990–91). Four Nordiques (Owen Nolan, Joe Sakic, Mats Sundin, and Scott Young) reached the 30-goal plateau. Nordiques goaltenders did not record a shutout during the regular season and playoffs. The Nordiques were not shut out in any game during the 84-game regular season and their six-game playoff series. In addition, the Nordiques led all teams in shorthanded goals scored during the regular season (21). The Nordiques also had the best shooting percentage in the league during the regular season, scoring 351 goals on just 2,519 shots (13.9%).

Offseason

NHL draft

The Eric Lindros trade

Eric Lindros was selected first overall by the Quebec Nordiques in the 1991 NHL Entry Draft. Lindros had signaled in advance that he would never play for the Nordiques, citing distance, lack of marketing potential, and having to speak French. He went as far as to refuse to wear the team's jersey on draft day; the team selected him anyway.

The president of the Nordiques publicly announced that they would make Lindros the centerpiece of their franchise turnaround, and refused to trade Lindros, saying that he would not have a career in the NHL as long as he held out. Due to Lindros' popularity and hype, it is alleged that the NHL president intervened to get the Nordiques to trade him, as it would otherwise damage the image of the league. During the hold out, Lindros spent the time playing with the Oshawa Generals and also participated in the 1992 Winter Olympics, winning a silver medal.

In 1992, the Nordiques worked out trades for him with both the New York Rangers and Philadelphia Flyers. Eventually an arbitrator, Larry Bertuzzi (grand-uncle of Todd Bertuzzi), ruled in favour of the Flyers, for whom he played from 1992 to 2000, most of the time as the team's captain.  The trade between the Nordiques and the Rangers that was ruled invalid by the arbitrator had Lindros being traded for Doug Weight, Tony Amonte, Alexei Kovalev, John Vanbiesbrouck and three first round draft picks (1993, 1994 and 1995) and $12 million.

Regular season

Final standings

Schedule and results

Player statistics

Playoffs

Quebec vs. Montreal
Montreal head coach Jacques Demers held himself to a promise he made to goaltender Patrick Roy earlier in the season and kept him as the starting goaltender despite a couple of weak goals allowed in the first two games of the series against the Nordiques. With the Canadiens staring a potential 3–0 series deficit to the rival Nords in the face, overtime in Game 3 was marked by two disputed goals that were reviewed by the video goal judge. The first review ruled that Stephan Lebeau had knocked the puck in with a high stick, but the second upheld the Habs' winning goal, as it was directed in by the skate of Quebec defenceman Alexei Gusarov, and not that of a Montreal player.

Transactions
The Nordiques were involved in the following transactions during the 1992–93 season.

Trades

Waivers

Expansion Draft

Free agents

Awards and honors

References
 Nordiques on Hockey Database

Quebec Nordiques season, 1992-93
Quebec Nordiques seasons
Que
1992 in Quebec
1993 in Quebec